Rolf Hoppe (18 March 1945 – 22 December 1969) was a Chilean athlete. He competed in the men's javelin throw at the 1968 Summer Olympics.

References

1945 births
1969 deaths
Athletes (track and field) at the 1968 Summer Olympics
Chilean male javelin throwers
Olympic athletes of Chile